The Acrobat (French: L'acrobate) is a 1941 French comedy film directed by Jean Boyer and starring Fernandel, Jean Tissier and Thérèse Dorny.

It was made at the Victorine Studios in Nice, in the Unoccupied Zone of France. The film's art direction was by Paul-Louis Boutié and Guy de Gastyne.

Cast
 Fernandel as Ernest Sauce  
 Jean Tissier as Briquet  
 Thérèse Dorny as Pauline  
 Marcel Carpentier as Le dîneur  
 Jean Brochard as Le commissaire  
 Paulette Berger as La comtesse de Puypeux  
 Lucien Callamand as Le médecin-chef  
 Pierre Labry as Dubier  
 Fernand Flament as Un infirmier  
 Nicolas Amato 
 Les Zemgano as Les frères Brindisi  
 Charles Dechamps as Le comte de Puypeux  
 Gaby Wagner as L'infirmière

References

Bibliography 
 Jacques Lorcey. Fernandel. Éditions Ramsay, 1990.

External links 
 

1941 films
French comedy films
1941 comedy films
1940s French-language films
Films directed by Jean Boyer
Circus films
French black-and-white films
1940s French films